Dannhauser Local Municipality is an administrative area in the Amajuba District of KwaZulu-Natal in South Africa. The municipality is named after Renier Dannhauser, a German settler who in 1872 purchased four farms in the area from the then owner, the Natal government.

The major economic sectors within Dannhauser are agriculture and mining. Mining is however, undergoing a movement away from large scale operations to smaller operations.

Main places
The 2001 census divided the municipality into the following main places:

Politics 

The municipal council consists of twenty-five members elected by mixed-member proportional representation. Thirteen councillors are elected by first-past-the-post voting in thirteen wards, while the remaining twelve are chosen from party lists so that the total number of party representatives is proportional to the number of votes received. 

In the election of 1 November 2021 the African National Congress (ANC) lost its majority, winning a plurality of nine seats on the council. The following table shows the results of the election.

References

External links
 http://www.dannhauser.gov.za/

Local municipalities of the Amajuba District Municipality
Dannhauser Local Municipality